Chrysallis mindoroensis is a species of medium-sized, air-breathing land snail, a terrestrial pulmonate gastropod mollusk in the family Camaenidae.

Distribution
This terrestrial species is found in Mindoro, Philippines.

References

External links
 Biolib
 Zipcodezoo
 Broderip, W. J. (1841). Description of shells collected and brought to this country by Hugh Cuming, Esq. Proceedings of the Zoological Society of London. 8 ["1840": 83-87, 94-96, 119-124, 155-159, 180-182. London]
 Mörch, O. A. L. (1852-1853). Catalogus conchyliorum quae reliquit D. Alphonso d'Aguirra & Gadea Comes de Yoldi, Regis Daniae Cubiculariorum Princeps, Ordinis Dannebrogici in Prima Classe & Ordinis Caroli Tertii Eques. Fasc. 1, Cephalophora, 170 pp. [1852; Fasc. 2, Acephala, Annulata, Cirripedia, Echinodermata, 74 [+2] pp. [1853]. Hafniae [Copenhagen]: L. Klein. 76: p. post 1 April 1853]
 Richardson, L. (1983). Bradybaenidae: Catalog of species. Tryonia. 9: 1-253

Camaenidae
Gastropods described in 1892